Jan Doležal may refer to:

Jan Doležal (decathlete) (born 1996), Czech decathlete
Jan Doležal (fencer), competitor in Men's sabre at the 2013 World Fencing Championships
Jan Doležal (footballer) (born 1993), Croatian footballer

See also
Doležal